Jonas Votaw House, also known as the Votaw-Jacqua House, is a historic home located at Portland, Jay County, Indiana.  It was built in 1875, and is a two-story, Italianate style brick dwelling, with additions built in 1925 and 1978. It sits on a stone foundation and has a cross-gable roof.  It features an overhanging eaves with cornice, pedimented entrance, and segmental arched windows.

It was listed on the National Register of Historic Places in 2004.

References

Houses on the National Register of Historic Places in Indiana
Italianate architecture in Indiana
Houses completed in 1875
Buildings and structures in Jay County, Indiana
National Register of Historic Places in Jay County, Indiana